The 1890 Harvard Crimson football team was an American football team that represented Harvard University in the 1890 college football season. The team finished with an 11–0 record, shut out nine of eleven opponents, and outscored all opponents by a total of 555 to 12. 

The team also won Harvard's first national championship, receiving retroactive recognition as national champion from the Billingsley Report, Helms Athletic Foundation, Houlgate System, National Championship Foundation, and Parke H. Davis. On November 22, Harvard defeated Walter Camp's previously-unbeaten Yale Bulldogs to secure the championship; it was Harvard's first football victory over Yale since 1875. Harvard did not play Princeton (11–1–1) during the 1890 season.

Five Harvard players were selected by Caspar Whitney to the 1890 All-America college football team: quarterback Dudley Dean; halfback John J. Corbett; end Frank Hallowell; center John Cranston; and tackle Marshall Newell. Other players included end and team captain Arthur Cumnock, halfback James P. Lee, Herb Alward, Hiland Orlando Stickney, Bernard Trafford, and tackle Joshua Damon Upton. George A. Stewart and George C. Adams were the team's coaches.

Schedule

Gallery of Harvard players

References

Harvard
Harvard Crimson football seasons
College football national champions
College football undefeated seasons
Harvard Crimson football